was a  of the Imperial Japanese Navy. Her name means "Purple Wave" or "Waves of Wisterias".

Service
She was damaged by a dud aerial torpedo during an air raid at Rabaul on 5 November 1943, with one dead and nine wounded. The ship participated in the Battle of Philippine Sea.

In the Battle of Leyte Gulf, Fujinami escorted the 1st Diversion Attack Force, commanded by Admiral Kurita Takeo. She sustained minor damage from the air attacks on 24–25 October due to near-misses and strafing.

In the Battle off Samar on 25 October Fujinami was detached to assist , then she removed survivors and scuttled the cruiser with a torpedo. Some US survivors of the escort carrier  have stated that the commanding officer Cmdr. Tatsuji Matsuzaki  restrained his men from firing on them as they floated by Fujinami and was allegedly seen to salute the American sailors.

She was lost with all hands, including the Chōkai survivors. The commanding officer was Cmdr. Tatsuji Matsuzaki from 31 July 1943 – 27 October 1944 (KIA).

References

External links
 CombinedFleet.com: Yūgumo-class destroyers
 CombinedFleet.com: Fujinami history
  

Yūgumo-class destroyers
World War II destroyers of Japan
Destroyers sunk by aircraft
Shipwrecks in the Sulu Sea
World War II shipwrecks in the Pacific Ocean
1943 ships
Warships lost with all hands
Maritime incidents in October 1944
Ships sunk by US aircraft
Ships built by Fujinagata Shipyards